Silvia Pinal, frente a ti is a Mexican biographical television series directed by Carla Estrada and Mónica Miguel based on the life of the Mexican producer and actress Silvia Pinal. It stars Itatí Cantoral as the titular character. The series premiered on Las Estrellas on 24 February 2019 and ended on 22 March 2019.

Cast 
 Itatí Cantoral as Silvia Pinal
 Nicole Vale as Young Silvia Pinal
 Mía Rubín as Teen Silvia Pinal
 Lara Campos as Child Silvia Pinal
 Gala Prieto as Child Silvia Pinal
 Alberto Casanova as Rafael Banquells
 Marcelo Córdoba as Arturo de Córdova
 Pablo Montero as Gustavo Alatriste
 Harry Geithner as Emilio Azcárraga Milmo
 Eleazar Gómez Young Emilio Azcárraga Milmo
 Gonzalo Guzmán as Felipe Román
 Arturo Peniche as Luis Pinal
 Gabriela Rivero as Sonia
 Roberta Burns as Young Sonia
 Luis José Santander as Moisés Pasquel
 Leticia Perdigón as Eva
 Roberto Blandón as Luis Buñuel
 Kenia Gascón as Merilú
 María de la Fuente as Young Merilú
 Fátima Torre as Concha
 Ricardo Franco as Jorge Negrete
 Pedro Romo as Ramón
 Jorge Gallego as Pedro Infante
 Patricia Bernal as Jovita
 Sharis Cid as Libertad Lamarque
 Adriana Nieto as Livia
 Odemaris Ruiz as Young Livia
 Mari Jose Alanís as Teen Livia
 Sebastian Moncayo as Ernesto
 José María Negri as Andrés Soler
 Fernando Alonso as Severiano
 David Ramos as Diego Rivera
 José María Galeano as Enrique Rodríguez Alday "El Güero"
 Rafael Amador as Emilio Fernández
 Sara Nieto as Madre Superiora
 Noelia Zanón as Carmen
 Maya Mishalska as Jeanne
 Sara Montalvo as Josefina
 Carmen Becerra as Sara Dorantes
 Cassandra Sánchez Navarro as Viridiana Alatriste
 Victoria Biagio as Child Viridiana Alatriste
 Hany Sáenz as Antonia
 Lorena Álvarez as Teresa
 Saturnino Martínez as Guillermo Monroy
 Ernesto Godoy as Carlos
 Héctor Álvarez as Rodolfo
 Raúl Araiza as Raúl Araiza
 Mane de la Parra as Fernando Frade
 Héctor Cruz as Mario Montoya
 Pedro Sicard as Tulio Demicheli
 Ernesto Laguardia as Julio
 Michel López as Javier Garcia
 María Chacón as Alondra
 Vanya Aguayo as Fanny

Production 
In December 2016 it was confirmed that Televisa was preparing a series based on the life of Silvia Pinal, and that production would begin in February 2017. Then in May 2017 it was announced that the series would be canceled, but later it was confirmed that it was only postponed. Because of this Carla Estrada said "It is a project that does not interest Televisa at the moment, so the pre-production of the series would be resumed in November 2017". On November 16, 2017 the beginning of the production of the series was officially confirmed. Filming ended in April 2018.

Casting 
For the role of Silvia Pinal in her adult stage, it was thought in Fernanda Castillo, due to their resemblance, but Castillo rejected the character because she was already filming the series El Señor de los Cielos. On 28 March 2017, Carla Estrada confirmed Itatí Cantoral as the adult protagonist of the series through her Twitter account. In a press release Estrada confirmed the participation of actresses Mía Rubín, Gala Prieto, Lara Campos, Nicole Vale and Sylvia Pasquel who will play Pinal at different stages of her life.

Ratings 
 
}}

Episodes 

Notes

Special

Awards and nominations

References

External links 
 

Mexican drama television series
Las Estrellas original programming
Television series by Televisa
2019 Mexican television series debuts
Spanish-language television shows
2019 Mexican television series endings
Biographical television series
Television series about actors
Cultural depictions of actors